Kirkham is a surname. Notable people with the surname include:
Charles B. Kirkham, American pioneer aero engine and plane builder
Don Kirkham, American soil scientist
Don Kirkham (cyclist), Australian cyclist
Frances Kirkham, British judge 
Fred Kirkham (1937–2007), Australian rower, songwriter and judge 
Fred Kirkham (football manager) (died 1949), English football referee and manager of Tottenham Hotspur
Glenn Kirkham, English hockey player
Ian Kirkham (born 1963), English saxophonist 
John Kirkham (adventurer) (c. 1830 – 1876), British adventurer
Jon Kirkham (born 1984), British motorcycle racer
Kathleen Kirkham (1895–1961), silent film actress
Millie Kirkham, American backing singer
Oscar A. Kirkham (1880–1958), leading figure in The Church of Jesus Christ of Latter-day Saints 
Paul Kirkham (born 1969), English footballer
Peter Kirkham, English footballer
Reg Kirkham (1919–1999), English footballer
Richard Kirkham (born 1955), American philosopher
Rick Kirkham, American journalist
Stanton Davis Kirkham (1868–1944), American naturalist, philosopher, ornithologist and author
Tom Kirkham, English football referee
Tommy Kirkham, Northern Ireland loyalist politician
Tony Kirkham (born 1957), English botanist
Wilf Kirkham (1901–1974), English footballer

English toponymic surnames